The Territory-wide System Assessment (TSA) is an assessment introduced by the Education Commission in the report of "Reform Proposal for the Education System in Hong Kong" in September 2000.

The Territory-wide System Assessment is held in June every year since 2004 for students of Primary 3, Primary 6 (implemented in alternate year starting from 2011) and Secondary 3. The Territory-wide System Assessment is designed for facilitating learning and teaching after evaluating the average learning standard of the students in the subject of Chinese language, English language and Mathematics at the end of key stage 1-3.

Introduction 
The Territory-wide System Assessment (TSA) is a territory-level assessment launched and administered by the Education Bureau (Chinese:教育局) since 2004. The aims of the Territory-wide System Assessment is to objectively assess the basic learning competencies and learning progress of the students at different stages of learning. The capabilities of students are analysed through the Territory-wide System Assessment in order to improve the effectiveness in learning and teaching. Educational policies can be reviewed with the help of the data collected through the Territory-wide System Assessment.

The Territory-wide System Assessment is conducted in the form of pencil and paper (except Chinese and English oral assessment) and the examined subjects are Chinese Language, English Language and Mathematics. The Territory-wide System Assessment is compulsory for all Primary 3, Primary 6 and Secondary 3 students from government-subsidised schools. The assessment results of the students with intellectual disabilities, e.g. suffering from dyslexia or mental retardation can be excluded after getting medical approval.

Subjects Examined

Chinese Language 
The assessment of Chinese language is divided into 5 sub-papers each with a focus on a specific skill of reading, writing, listening, oral and multimedia information respectively. Meanwhile, candidates from primary three, six and secondary three will be chosen randomly to apply the test of multimedia information in every school.

Writing Assessment 

 Primary three and Primary six
Assessment Time: 40 minutes

Number of questions: 2

Question Form: short essay (mainly narrative, descriptive essay) and practical writing (letter, invitation card, memo, notice, diary, journal, etc)

Word Limitation: No

 Secondary three
Assessment Time: 75 minutes

Number of Questions: 2

Question Form:Specified writing and practical writing (mainly announcement, notice, speech and reports, etc)

Word Limitations: No

Listening Assessment 
 Assessment Time: approximately 20 minutes 
 Type of Recording: two to three parts (depends on the recordings’ nature)
 Recording Format: recording will only be played once
 Question Form: Multiple choice questions

Reading Assessment 

 Primary three and Primary six
Assessment Time: 25 minutes

Number of Questions: two short stories and one to two practical writings (depends on the questions’ nature)

Type of passages: narrative, exposition and practical writing (letter, invitation card, etc)

Question Form: Multiple choice questions, fill in the blanks, sentence ordering, short questions, etc

 Secondary three
Assessment Time: 30 minutes

Type of passages: Vernacular Chinese (Narration, Description, Exposition, Argumentation, and lyrical literature. etc), Classical Chinese, practical passage

Question Form: Multiple choice questions

Multimedia Information Assessment 

 Primary three and Primary six
Assessment Time: 15 minutes

Participants: 30 students

Type of Video: two to three parts (depends on the videos’ nature)

Video Format: video will only be played once

Question Form: Multiple choice questions

 Secondary three
Assessment Time: 15 minutes

Participants: all secondary three students

Video Format: video will only be played once

Question Form: Multiple choice questions

Oral Assessment 
Assessment Time: approximately four to eight minutes

Participants: twelve to twenty-four students

Form of Assessment:
 Storytelling through pictures
 Group Discussion
 Secondary three
Assessment Time: approximately seven to eleven minutes

Participants: twelve to twenty-four students

Form of Assessment:
 Individual Speech
 Group Discussion

English Language 

The assessment of English language in primary school is divided into 3 sub-papers each with a focus on a specific skill of reading and  writing, listening and speaking respectively. The assessment of English language in secondary school is divided into 4 sub-papers each focus on a specific skill of reading, writing, listening and speaking respectively. Candidates from every school will be chosen randomly to attend the speaking assessment.

Reading and writing Assessment 
The question form of Reading part is Multiple choice question. The Writing part requires to write an essay based on a topic or write a story based on the pictures given.

 Primary three
Assessment time: 25 minutes

Word limit for Writing part: Write about 30 words

 Primary six
Assessment time: 50 minutes

Word limit for Writing part: Write about 80 words

 Secondary three
Assessment time for Reading part: 30 minutes

Assessment time for Writing part: 40 minutes

Word limit for Writing part: Write about 150 words.

Listening Assessment 
The question form of primary school assessment is Multiple choice question while the question forms of secondary school assessment are Multiple choice question and filling the blanks. Each recording will be played twice.

 Primary three
Assessment time: 20 minutes

 Primary six
Assessment time: 30 minutes

 Secondary three
Assessment time: 25 minutes

Speaking Assessment 
 Primary three
Preparation time: 2 minutes

Assessment time: 3 minutes

The assessment is divided into two parts. Part 1 is reading alone and part 2 is answering one question asked by teacher.

 Primary six
Preparation time: 2 minutes

Assessment time: 3 minutes

The assessment is divided into two parts. Part 1 is reading alone and part 2 is answering one question asked by teacher.

 Secondary three
Preparation time: 3 minutes

Assessment time: 2 minutes

Candidates are required to give an individual presentation

Mathematics 
The assessment of Mathematics is provided in both Chinese and English according to different needs of students. Every student from all schools have to apply this assessment.
 Assessment time:
 Primary three: 40 minutes 
 Primary six: 50 minutes
 Secondary three: 65 minutes

 Dimension:
 Number and Algebra
 Shape and Space 
 Measures
 Data Handling

Timeline - Problems and Controversy 
2009

See also:   2009 flu pandemic in Hong Kong
 In 2009, because of the first known cluster of local transmission of the swine flu in Hong Kong, the Education Bureau (Chinese:教育局) ordered the closure of all primary schools and the cancellation of the Territory-wide System Assessment this year. However, the listening assessment which had been held on 23 and 24 June was not affected.

2014
 In the Secondary 3 Chinese Language Territory-wide System Assessment 2014, two schools wrongly distributed the reading and writing papers to the students and this was the first case since the start of Territory-wide System Assessment in 2004. The two schools involved were the Tung Wah Group of Hospitals Sun Hoi Directors' College and the PAOC Ka Chi Secondary School respectively.

2015
 Parents concerning the effects brought by the Territory-wide System Assessment started an online petition, requesting a cancellation of the Primary 3 Territory-wide System Assessment exam. As most of the schools require students to finish large amount of complementary exercises and attend extra lessons conducted for the Territory-wide System Assessment, parents worrying about the health and mental states of children requested for the cancellation of the exam. Tens of thousands of parents signed a Facebook petition calling for the Primary Three exams to be cancelled, saying they put too much pressure on children.  
 Details
 30 October --- Kau Yan School , a private primary school in Sai Ying Pun, announced that it would boycott the tests this academic year, saying the scheme was not in line with the school's mission and was no good for students.
 31 October --- The Education Bureau (Chinese: 教育局) admitted that there were problems with the controversial Territory-wide System Assessment and had pledged to review the assessments.

References 

Educational assessment and evaluation
Education in Hong Kong